Jormua is a very old village ashore the lake of Oulujärvi in the town of Kajaani, Finland. The village has a population of about 750. The Jormua Ophiolite is named after the village.

Villages in Finland
Kajaani